

G

References